The Food Commission is an independent food watchdog campaigning for safer, healthier food in the UK. The commission is primarily funded by public subscriptions to their campaign journal, the Food Magazine.

External links
The Food Commission
Chewonthis website aimed at school pupils

Political advocacy groups in the United Kingdom
British food and drink organisations